Asaad Wahda (English: The Happiest One) is the eighth studio album by Lebanese singer Elissa released by Rotana on 19 June 2012, making it her fifth album released by Rotana Records.

Album background
In this album, Elissa shares her theories on the philosophy of happiness, as she spoke to media about the themes of joy and happiness and her own take on it. The album features 10 songs sung in the Egyptian and Lebanese dialects. The singer collaborated with a number of famous writers and composers from around the Arab world like, poet Baha Al Din, composers Mohamed Yahia, Rami Jamal, and Mohamad Dia. Elissa was asked if she was the happiest person as her album implies, to which she answered at full steam:

Artwork
Elissa released via Twitter a promotional photo that showed her with a black veil on her head and red rose in her mouth. However, she later declared that the picture shown wasn't really the one for the cover. When the album was released, the album's physical cover had a completely different cover, while the digital versions used the aforementioned photo as the cover.

Release
Originally, the album was set to be released on 25 June 2012, however, eight days before the official release date, Elissa was shocked to discover the entire album had been leaked on different internet websites. Upon discovering the illegal version of the album, Elissa announced on her official pages on the social internet social networks Facebook and Twitter that she would be releasing the album within the next 48 hours in the Middle East. The album was released on 19 June.

Track listing

Personnel 
Adapted from the album liner notes.

 Hubert Ghorayeb - executive producer
 Edouard Meunier - mixing
 Farouk Mohamed Hasan - accordion (tracks 2, 4, 10)
 Ammar Trad - accordion (track 11)
 Ahmed Ragab - bass guitar (tracks 4, 10)
 Hisham Essam - bouzouki (track 6)
 Mohamed Atif Imam - conductor [string section] (tracks 2, 4, 6, 10)
 Philippe M. - guitar (track 1)
 Mostafa Aslan - guitar (tracks 2, 4, 5, 6, 10)
 Jihad Assaad - kanun (track 11)
 Maged Soroor - kanun (tracks 2, 6, 10)
 Reda Beder - ney (tracks 2, 6, 10)
 Ihab Boo - percussion (track 4)
 Mohamed Saleh - percussion (track 11)
 Elie Barbar - vocals recording (tracks 2, 3, 6, 7, 8, 9, 10, 13)
 Maurice Tawile - vocals recording (tracks 1, 4, 5, 11, 12, 14)
 Nidal Abo Samra - soprano saxophone (track 9)
 Tamer Ghoneim - strings (track 5)
 Ahmed Ayadi - tabla (tracks 2, 10)
 Hisham El Arabi - tambourine (tracks 2, 10)
 Mohamed Atif Imam - violin (track 2)
 Mohamed Medhat - violin (track 4)
 Mahmoud Soroor - violin (track 10)
 Nazir Mawas - violin (track 1)
 Abdallah Ziade - strings section recording (tracks 1, 9)
 Ahmad Gouda - sound engineer (tracks 2, 10)
 Aytekin Kurt - sound engineer (tracks 3, 8, 12)
 Hani Mahrous - sound engineer (track 4)
 Amir Mahrous - guitar recording (track 7)
 Matthias Clamer - photographer
 Bassam Fattouh - make up
 Yehia Shokr - hair

Charts

References

Elissa (singer) albums
Rotana Records albums
2012 albums